"Be Like the Kettle and Sing" is a popular song composed and written by Tommie Connor, Walter Ridley and Desmond O'Connor. It was first performed by Vera Lynn in the 1943 film We'll Meet Again.

Vera Lynn recorded the song for Decca Records (catalog No. F8254) in the UK on 16 December 1942 with Mantovani & His Orchestra.

See also
1943 in music
1943 in British music

References

1943 songs
Songs written by Tommie Connor